Ferncourt High School located in Claremont, St Ann, Jamaica is co-educational and has a student body of approximately 1500.

History

Ferncourt High school was officially opened in 1938. Housed in a building previously belonging to Dr. Curphey, known as 'Cedars,' Ferncourt welcomed its first set of girls who all boarded on the school's compound.

Mrs. Simpson devised a curriculum which included classical subjects such as French, Latin and Music along with the fundamental social graces, the staff was recruited from Jamaica as well as overseas.

As the institution was privately owned, the acceptance of students was based primarily on the character and resources of the parents as well as the conduct and ability of the students.

The school later became a co-educational institution and the population maintained a steady growth and by 1959 the population had reached two hundred and sixty six. In 1955, the government formally recognized the school which became a public entity in 1960. As the school continued to expand and the society began to change there were curriculum changes. Less emphasis was now placed on the classical subjects such as French and Latin and more emphasis on the technical subjects. Presently Femcourt incorporates traditional high school education with training in Industrial Arts and Practical Commercial Skills. Ferncourt High School is also one of the few traditional high schools in Jamaica that has a Technical Department and it is the only government owned traditional high school in Region Three.

Mrs. Simpson held the position of Principal from its opening until 1961. When she retired Mr. Weller took over the leadership of the school for a short while. He was followed by Mr. James Laing, Mr. Oswald Fisher, Mr. Byron Brown, Mr. O.R. Bell, Miss. V.J. Clarke, Rev'd St. Aubyn Hay, Mrs. Sharon Kelly- Stair, Mrs. Ethyl Mullings, Rev'd Claudette Johnson, Mrs. Veronica Archer,Rev'd Lenworth Sterling and currently Mr.Sheldon Thomas.

Ferncourt High currently has a second campus located at Brittonville. The school has extended its facilities with staff residences, an auditorium and an extra laboratory to accommodate a population of 1556 students and a faculty of over sixty on both campuses.

Curriculum

Students enter at 1st form (7th grade) and continue to 5th form (11th grade) when they sit various subjects in the CXC and CCSLC exams. Most recently a 6th form (12 and 13th grade) programme has been added.

Extracurricular activities

Clubs and Societies:
4-H Club –
Red Cross Society
Jamaica Combined Cadet Force
Tourism Action Plan
Environment Club
Girls Guide
Social Graces
United Nations
Wellness Club
ISCF
Photography/Astronomy Club
Music Club
Spanish Club 
Dance Group
Mathematics club
Sporting Activities:
Track & Field
Netball

For sports the school population is divided into five houses:
Curphy
Simpson
Jacob
Brown
Smith

Emblems
Motto
The school's motto is "Labor Vincit" which, when translated to English, means "Hard work conquers".

Notable alumni

Seymour Mullings, former Deputy Prime Minister in the PNP administration of the 70s and 80s.
Aloun Assamba, former Minister of Tourism and MP for Southeast St Ann.
Novlene Williams-Mills, Jamaican Track and field representative, multiple time Olympics, World and Commonwealth Games medalist.

Headmasters

See also
 Education in Jamaica
 List of Schools in Jamaica

References

External links
Aerial view.
Photos:

Schools in Jamaica
Educational institutions established in 1938
Buildings and structures in Saint Ann Parish
1938 establishments in the British Empire